Felicity Ama Agyemang (born 15 August 1973), also known as Nana Ama McBrown, is a Ghanaian actress, TV presenter and a music writer. She rose to prominence for her role in television series Tentacles. Later, she found mainstream success following her role in the Twi-language movie "Asoreba" and "Kumasi Yonko". She was the host of television cooking show McBrown Kitchen and entertainment talk show United Showbiz on UTV until March 2023 when she moved to Media General.

Early life and education
Nana Ama McBrown was born Felicity Ama Agyemang in Kumasi, Ghana, on 15 August 1977. Her mother, Cecilia Agyenim Boateng, and her father Kwabena Nkrumah, divorced when McBrown was young. With her father gone and her mother unable to take care of her and her six other siblings, she together with her siblings were adopted by Kofi McBrown and her aunt, Madam Betty Obiri Yeboah.

Along with her six siblings, McBrown grew up in Kwadaso, Kumasi with her aunt and her adopted father. McBrown considers her aunt her "real mother" and has spoken of her gratitude to her for having provided a stable and caring home.

McBrown attended St. Peter's International Residential School, moved on to Minnesota International and then to Central International. She continued to Kwadaso L.A. J.S.S, although she ended up dropping out and could not sit for the Basic Education Certificate Exams. McBrown later attended College of Business where she obtained a secretarial certificate.

Career

Acting 
McBrown's acting career started after she answered an audition call on the radio by Miracle Films and was hired to do costuming instead; however, on the set, she was given the lead role after the director, Samuel Nyamekye, felt that she was better suited for the role. In 2001, her first movie, That Day, was released, launching her career. Her performance in That Day helped her land a spot on the TV series Tentacles.

In 2007, McBrown appeared in the movie "Asoreba", co-starring Agya Koo and Mercy Aseidu. Since then, she has had roles in a number of movies.

Ambassadorial Deals 
McBrown is the brand ambassador of Royal Drinks. She is the brand ambassador of So Klin washing powder. In March 2021, she was appointed as an ambassador for the COVID-19 National Trust Fund. She is also a brand ambassador for MacBerry biscuits. She is also the Ambassador for the brand Hisense.

Television Host 
She was the host of television cooking show McBrown Kitchen and entertainment talk show United Showbiz on UTV until March 2023.

Personal life
McBrown has been linked to Omar Sheriff Captan, her co-star in a number of movies, although both have denied any romantic attachments. In 2004, McBrown briefly dated Okyeame Kwame, a Ghanaian musician. In the course of the year, the pair were seen traveling together all over Ghana promoting Kwame's solo release.

On 15 July 2007, McBrown was enthroned as the "Nkosuohemaa" (or ceremonial queen-mother of development) of Assin-Basiako near Assin-Fosu in the Assin North District of the Central Region, Ghana.

In 2016, she married her longtime boyfriend Maxwell Mawu Mensah. In February 2019 McBrown gave birth to a girl in Canada.

Selected filmography

Coming to Africa
Nnipa ye bad
SideChic Gang
Abro
He Is Mine
Madam Joan
Nsem Pii
Kumasi Yonko 
Odo Ntira
Madam Moke
Love Comes Back
Kae Dabi
Asoreba
Wo Nyame som po ni
Alicia
Fools Paradise
Dea Ade Wo No
Girl Connection
Playboy
My Own Mother
Friday Night
Di Asempa (Osofo Maame)
Asabea (The Blind Girl)
Evil Heart
The Pastor's Wife
Pastors Club
Onyame Tumi
I Know My Rights
The End
Onyame ye Onyame
John and John (2017)
Obidea Aba
My Soldier Father
Alhaji Grusa
Agya Koo trotro Driver
Nana Goes To Mecca
Games of the Heart
That Day
Otan Hunu Kwah
Aloe Vera
Asantewaa
 Soantie pastor

Honors and awards 
McBrown has acted in many movies and has a number of awards including Best English Actress, Best Actress in a Leading Role, Best Traditional movie and Best Story at the 2011 Kumawood Awards. She also won the favorite Actress at the 2016 Ghana Movie Awards and Eurostar Best Dressed Female Celebrity on the red carpet at the 2016 Ghana Movie Awards. She also won Golden Actress in a comedy movie with the movie SideChic Gang at the Golden Movie Awards in 2018.

In 2020, she was awarded the Radio and Television Personality Awards TV Female Entertainment Show Host Of The Year 2019–2020. She also picked the TV Female Presenter Of The Year 2019–2020 award.

In 2020 she won the award for Outstanding Woman Brand Influencer at the third edition of the Ghana Outstanding Women Awards (GOWA).

In March 2021, she was awarded the Female Actor of the Year in the Entertainment Achievement Awards.

See also
McBrown Kitchen
SideChic Gang
List of Ghanaian actors

References

External links

Biography- Nana Ama McBrown

Living people
Ghanaian film actresses
People from Kumasi
1977 births